Dmitry Kuskov (14 December 1876 – 11 October 1956) was a sports shooter from the Russian Empire. He competed in six events at the 1912 Summer Olympics.

References

1876 births
1956 deaths
Male sport shooters from the Russian Empire
Olympic competitors for the Russian Empire
Shooters at the 1912 Summer Olympics
Sportspeople from Saint Petersburg